Fulton House may refer to:

in the United Kingdom
Fulton House, Swansea, Wales, a student services building at Swansea University

in the United States
(by state then city)
House at 7356 San Jose Boulevard, Jacksonville, Florida, also known as the Fulton House, listed on the National Register of Historic Places (NRHP)
Charles Fulton House, Stevensville, Montana, listed on the NRHP in Ravalli County
Fulton House, Chicago, Illinois, historic condominium building on the Chicago River
Fred and Rosa Fulton Barn, Selma, Iowa, listed on the NRHP in Jefferson County
Fulton Farm, Sidney, Ohio
Fulton–Taylor House, The Dalles, Oregon, NRHP-listed, in Wasco County
Fulton Opera House, Lancaster, Pennsylvania, NRHP-listed, in Lancaster County
Fulton House (McConnellsburg, Pennsylvania), NRHP-listed, in Fulton County
Fulton Log House, Pittsburgh, Pennsylvania
Robert Fulton Birthplace, Quarryville, Pennsylvania, NRHP-listed, in Lancaster County
George W. Fulton Mansion, Fulton, Texas, NRHP-listed, in Aransas County
E. M. Fulton House, Wise, Virginia, NRHP-listed, in Wise County